Fête des belles eaux, or Feast of the beautiful waters in English, is a 1937 composition by French composer Olivier Messiaen. The work is scored for six ondes Martenots and was commissioned for the 1937 Paris Exposition. The work was written to accompany the movement of the fountains at the Exhibition.

Structure

This composition is in eight movements and takes approximately 30 minutes to perform. The movement list is as follows:

The melodic theme used in the fourth movement was also used later in the fifth movement ("Louange à l'Éternité de Jésus") of Messiaen's Quatuor pour la fin du temps.

References

External links 
 Olivier Messiaen: Fête des belles eaux (1937) (YouTube)

1937 compositions
Compositions by Olivier Messiaen
Exposition Internationale des Arts et Techniques dans la Vie Moderne
World's fair music